This is a list of products produced by Bajaj Auto today or previously.

Current Line Up

Motorcycles
AVENGER CRUISE 220
AVENGER STREET 160
CT100
CT110/CT110X
CT125X
PULSAR RS200
PULSAR N250
PULSAR F250
PULSAR N160
PULSAR 125
PULSAR 150
PULSAR NS200
PULSAR NS160
PULSAR NS125
PLATINA 100
PLATINA 110/PLATINA 110 H-GEAR
DOMINAR 400
DOMINAR 250

Three Wheelers
RE Compact 2S
RE Compact 4S
RE Compact+
RE Maxima
RE Maxima X-Wide
RE Maxima Z
RE Maxima C
POD 200

Four Wheelers
Qute

Scooters
Bajaj Chetak Electric Scooter

Discontinued

Scooters
Bajaj 150
Bajaj Bravo
Bajaj Chetak
Bajaj Chetak 99
Bajaj Chetak 4s
Bajaj Cub
Bajaj Classic
Bajaj Kristal
Bajaj Legend
Bajaj M50
Bajaj M80
Bajaj M80 4s
Bajaj Priya
Bajaj Rave
Bajaj Sunny
Bajaj Stride
Bajaj Saffire
Bajaj Spirit
Bajaj Super
Bajaj Super Excel
Bajaj Super 99
Bajaj Wave
Bajaj Viking

Motorcycles
Bajaj Kawasaki 4S Champion 100
Bajaj Kawasaki Aspire 110
Bajaj Kawasaki Boxer 100
Bajaj Kawasaki Boxer AT 100
Bajaj Kawasaki Boxer AR 100
Bajaj Kawasaki Boxer CT 100
Bajaj kawasaki Caliber 110
Bajaj Kawasaki Caliber 115
Bajaj Kawasaki Caliber Croma 110
Bajaj kawasaki Eliminator 175
Bajaj Kawasaki KB100 
Bajaj Kawasaki KB125
Bajaj Kawasaki Wind 125
Bajaj Avenger 180
Bajaj Avenger 200
Bajaj Avenger Street 150
Bajaj Avenger Street 180 
Bajaj BYK 100
Bajaj Boxer BM150
Bajaj Discover 100 
Bajaj Discover 110
Bajaj Discover 125
Bajaj Discover 135 
Bajaj Discover 150 
Bajaj Discover 100M
Bajaj Discover 100T
Bajaj Discover 125M
Bajaj Discover 125T
Bajaj Discover 125ST
Bajaj Discover 150S
Bajaj Discover 150F
Bajaj Platina 125 
Bajaj Pulsar 200 DTS-I
Bajaj Pulsar 220F
Bajaj Pulsar 220S 
Bajaj Prowler RR125
Bajaj SX Enduro 100
Bajaj XCD 125 
Bajaj XCD 135

References

Bajaj Auto products
Bajaj Auto